The 1959 LPGA Championship was the fifth LPGA Championship, held July 2–6 at Sheraton Hotel Country Club in French Lick, Indiana.

Betsy Rawls won the first of her two LPGA Championships, one stroke ahead of Patty Berg. The final round on Sunday was delayed to Monday due to heavy rain and unplayable greens. Defending champion Mickey Wright finished nine strokes back in eighth place. It was the fourth of eight major titles for Rawls.

The course was designed by Donald Ross; it opened in 1917 and was originally known as the "Hill Course." It hosted the PGA Championship in 1924, the second of five won by Walter Hagen and the first of four consecutive. It is now named the "Donald Ross Course." The LPGA Championship returned to the course the following year in 1960.

Past champions in the field

Source:

Final leaderboard
Monday, July 6, 1959

Source:

References

Women's PGA Championship
Golf in Indiana
LPGA Championship
LPGA Championship
LPGA Championship
LPGA Championship
Women's sports in Indiana